Alfred Klaar (7 November 1848 – 4 November 1927) was an Austrian writer.

Biography 
Alfred Klaar was born on 7 November 1848 in Prague, Bohemia, Austrian Empire.

In July 1899, Klaar moved to Berlin with his wife,  (1869–1929).

Klaar died on 4 November 1927 in Charlottenburg, Berlin, Weimar Republic.

Publications 

 Die Litteratur des Auslandes (1873)
 Jos. Victor Scheffel (1876)
 Fahrende Komödianten (1876)
 Joseph II (c.1880)
 Das Moderne Drama, Dargestellt in Seinen Richtungen und Hauptvertretern (1883–84)
 Der Empfang (1888)
 Diskretion (c.1890)
 Wer Schimpft der Kauft (c.1890)
 Franz Grillparzer als Dramatiker (1891)
 F. Schmeykal (c.1894)
 Börne's Leben und Wirken (c.1899)
 Der Faustcyclus (c.1899)

References 

1848 births
1927 deaths
19th-century Austrian writers
Writers from Prague